This is a list of mammals of New South Wales.

The following tags are used to highlight each species' conservation status as assessed by the International Union for Conservation of Nature:

Some species were assessed using an earlier set of criteria. Species assessed using this system have the following instead of near threatened and least concern categories:

Subclass: Prototheria

Order: Monotremata 

 Family: Ornithorhynchidae
 Genus: Ornithorhynchus
 Platypus, Ornithorhynchus anatinus LR/lc
 Family: Tachyglossidae
 Genus: Tachyglossus
 Short-beaked echidna, Tachyglossus aculeatus LR/lc

Subclass: Theria

Infraclass: Marsupialia

Order: Dasyuromorphia 
 Family: Dasyuridae
 Subfamily: Dasyurinae
 Tribe: Phascogalini
 Genus: Antechinus
 Agile antechinus, Antechinus agilis LR/lc
 Yellow-footed antechinus, Antechinus flavipes LR/lc
 Brown antechinus, Antechinus stuartii LR/lc
 Dusky antechinus, Antechinus swainsonii LR/lc
 Genus: Dasycercus
 Crest-tailed mulgara, Dasycercus cristicauda LR/lc
 Genus: Dasyurus
 Western quoll, Dasyurus geoffroii LR/nt
 Tiger quoll, Dasyurus maculatus LR/nt
 Eastern quoll, Dasyurus viverrinus  reintroduced
 Genus: Sarcophilus
 Tasmanian devil, Sarcophilus harrisii  reintroduced
 Genus: Phascogale
 Brush-tailed phascogale, Phascogale tapoatafa LR/nt
 Subfamily: Sminthopsinae
 Tribe: Sminthopsini
 Genus: Antechinomys
 Kultarr, Antechinomys laniger LR/lc
 Genus: Ningaui
 Southern ningaui, Ningaui yvonneae LR/lc
 Genus: Sminthopsis
 Fat-tailed dunnart, Sminthopsis crassicaudata LR/lc
 White-footed dunnart, Sminthopsis leucopus VU
 Stripe-faced dunnart, Sminthopsis macroura LR/lc
 Slender-tailed dunnart, Sminthopsis murina LR/lc
 Tribe: Planigalini
 Genus: Planigale
 Paucident planigale, Planigale gilesi LR/lc
 Common planigale, Planigale maculata LR/lc
 Narrow-nosed planigale, Planigale tenuirostris LR/lc
 Family: Myrmecobiidae
 Genus: Myrmecobius
 Numbat, Myrmecobius fasciatus EN

Order: Diprotodontia 
 Suborder: Phalangeriformes
 Family: Acrobatidae
 Genus: Acrobates
 Feathertail glider, Acrobates pygmaeus LR/lc
 Family: Burramyidae
 Genus: Burramys
 Mountain pygmy possum, Burramys parvus CR
 Genus: Cercartetus
 Southwestern pygmy possum, Cercartetus concinnus LR/lc
 Eastern pygmy possum, Cercartetus nanus LR/lc
 Family: Petauridae
 Genus: Petaurus
 Yellow-bellied glider, Petaurus australis LR/lc
 Sugar glider, Petaurus breviceps LR/lc
Krefft's glider, Petaurus notatus NE
 Squirrel glider, Petaurus norfolcensis LR/lc
 Family: Phalangeridae
 Genus: Trichosurus
 Short-eared possum, Trichosurus caninus LR/lc
 Common brushtail possum, Trichosurus vulpecula LR/lc
 Family: Pseudocheiridae
 Genus: Petauroides
 Greater glider, Petauroides volans LR/lc
 Genus: Pseudocheirus
 Common ringtail possum, Pseudocheirus peregrinus LR/lc
 Suborder Macropodiformes
 Family: Macropodidae
 Genus: Macropus
Western grey kangaroo, Macropus fuliginosus LR/lc
 Eastern grey kangaroo, Macropus giganteus LR/lc
 Genus: Notamacropus
 Parma wallaby, N. parma LR/nt
 Whiptail wallaby, N. parryi LR/lc
 Red-necked wallaby, N. rufogriseus LR/lc
Genus: Osphranter
 Common wallaroo, O. robustus LR/lc
 Red kangaroo, O. rufus LR/lc
 Genus: Onychogalea
 Bridled nail-tail wallaby, Onychogalea fraenata EN
 Genus: Petrogale
 Brush-tailed rock-wallaby, Petrogale penicillata LR/nt
 Yellow-footed rock-wallaby, Petrogale xanthopus LR/nt
 Genus: Thylogale
 Red-legged pademelon, Thylogale stigmatica LR/lc
 Red-necked pademelon, Thylogale thetis LR/lc
 Genus: Wallabia
 Swamp wallaby, Wallabia bicolor LR/lc
 Family: Potoroidae
 Genus: Aepyprymnus
 Rufous rat-kangaroo, Aepyprymnus rufescens LR/lc
 Genus: Bettongia
 Boodie, Bettongia leseur LR/nt
 Genus: Potorous
 Long-footed potoroo, Potorous longipes EN
 Long-nosed potoroo, Potorous tridactylus LR/lc
 Suborder: Vombatiformes
 Family: Phascolarctidae
 Genus: Phascolarctos
 Koala, Phascolarctos cinereus LR/lc
 Family: Vombatidae
 Genus: Lasiorhinus
 Southern hairy-nosed wombat, Lasiorhinus latifrons LR/lc
 Genus: Vombatus
 Common wombat, Vombatus ursinus LR/lc

Order: Peramelemorphia 
 Family: Peramelidae
 Genus: Isoodon
 Northern brown bandicoot, Isoodon macrourus LR/lc
 Southern brown bandicoot, Isoodon obesulus E
 Genus: Perameles
 Long-nosed bandicoot, Perameles nasuta LR/lc
 Family: Thylacomyidae
 Genus: Macrotis
 Bilby, Macrotis lagotis VU

Infraclass: Placentalia

Order: Artiodactyla 
 Suborder: Ruminantia
 Family: Cervidae
 Genus: Dama
 Common fallow deer, Dama dama LC introduced
 Genus: Rusa
 Javan rusa, Rusa timorensis VU introduced

Order: Carnivora 
 Suborder: Caniformia
 Family: Canidae
 Genus: Canis
 Dingo, Canis lupus dingo
 Genus: Vulpes
 Red fox, Vulpes vulpes LR/lc introduced
 Family Otariidae
 Genus: Arctocephalus
 New Zealand fur seal, Arctocephalus forsteri LR/lc
 Brown fur seal, Arctocephalus pusillus LR/lc
 Subantarctic fur seal, Arctocephalus tropicalis LR/lc
 Genus: Neophoca
 Australian sea lion, Neophoca cinerea EN
 Family: Phocidae
 Genus: Hydrurga
 Leopard seal, Hydrurga leptonyx LR/lc
 Genus: Lobodon
 Crabeater seal, Lobodon carcinophagus
 Genus: Mirounga
 Southern elephant seal, Mirounga leonina LR/lc

Order: Cetacea 
 Suborder: Mysticeti
 Family: Balaenidae Genus: Eubalaena Southern right whale, Eubalaena australis LR/lc
 Family: Balaenopteridae
 Genus: Balaenoptera Antarctic minke whale, Balaenoptera bonaerensis DD
 Bryde's whale, Balaenoptera brydei DD
 Blue whale, Balaenoptera musculus EN
 Fin whale, Balaenoptera physalus EN
 Genus: Megaptera Humpback whale, Megaptera novaeangliae LR/lc
 Family: Cetotheriidae
 Genus: Caperea Pygmy right whale, Caparea marginata DD
 Suborder: Odontoceti
 Family: Delphinidae
 Genus: Feresa Pygmy killer whale, Feresa attenuata DD
 Genus: Globicephala Short-finned pilot whale, Globicephala macrorhynchus DD
 Long-finned pilot whale, Globicephala melas DD
 Genus: Grampus Risso's dolphin, Grampus griseus LR/lc
 Genus: Lagenodelphis Fraser's dolphin, Lagenodelphis hosei LR/lc
 Genus: Lissodelphis Southern right whale dolphin, Lissodelphis peronii DD
 Genus: Orcinus Killer whale or orca, Orcinus orca DD
 Genus: Peponocephala Melon-headed whale, Peponocephala electra LR/lc
 Genus: Pseudorca False killer whale, Pseudorca crassidens EN
 Genus: Sousa Indo-Pacific humpbacked dolphin, Sousa chinensis LR/nt
 Genus: Stenella Pantropical spotted dolphin, Stenella attenuata LR/lc
 Spinner dolphin, Stenella longirostris DD
 Striped dolphin, Stenella coeruleoalba LR/lc
 Genus: Steno Rough-toothed dolphin, Steno bredanensis LR/lc
 Genus: Tursiops Indo-Pacific bottlenose dolphin, Tursiops aduncus LR/nt
 Common bottlenose dolphin, Tursiops truncatus LR/lc
 Family: Physeteridae
 Genus: Kogia Pygmy sperm whale, Kogia breviceps DD
 Dwarf sperm whale, Kogia sima DD
 Genus: Physeter Sperm whale, Physeter macrocephalus VU
 Family: Ziphiidae
 Genus: Hyperoodon Southern bottlenose whale, Hyperoodon planifrons LR/lc
 Genus: Mesoplodon Andrews' beaked whale, Mesoplodon bowdoini DD
 Blainville's beaked whale, Mesoplodon densirostris DD
 Ginkgo-toothed beaked whale, Mesoplodon ginkgodens DD
 Gray's beaked whale, Mesoplodon grayi DD
 Strap-toothed whale, Mesoplodon layardii DD

 Order: Chiroptera 
 Suborder: Megachiroptera
 Family: Pteropodidae
 Genus: Nyctimene Eastern tube-nosed bat, Nyctimene robinsoni LR/lc
 Genus: Pteropus Black flying fox, Pteropus alecto LR/lc
 Grey-headed flying fox, Pteropus poliocephalus VU
 Little red flying fox, Pteropus scapulatus LR/lc
 Genus: Syconycteris Common blossom bat, Syconycteris australis LR/lc
 Suborder: Microchiroptera
 Family: Emballonuridae
 Genus: Saccolaimus Yellow-bellied sheath-tailed bat, Saccolaimus flaviventris LR/nt
 Genus: Taphozous Coastal sheath-tailed bat, Taphozous australis LR/nt
 Family: Molossidae
 Genus: Mormopterus Beccari's free-tailed bat, Mormopterus beccarii LR/lc
 East-coast free-tailed bat, Mormopterus norfolkensis VU
 Southern free-tailed bat, Mormopterus planiceps LR/lc
 Genus: Ozimops Loria's mastiff bat, Ozimops loriae Genus: Tadarida White-striped free-tailed bat, Tadarida australis LR/lc
 Family: Vespertilionidae
 Genus: Chalinolobus Large-eared pied bat, Chalinolobus dwyeri LR/nt
 Gould's wattled bat, Chalinolobus gouldii LR/lc
 Chocolate wattled bat, Calinolobus morio LR/lc
 Hoary wattled bat, Chaliniolobus nigrogriseus LR/lc
 Little pied bat, Chalinolobus picatus LR/nt
 Genus: Falsistrellus Eastern false pipistrelle, Falsistrellus tasmaniensis LR/lc
 Genus: Miniopterus Little bent-wing bat, Miniopterus australis LR/lc
 Common bent-wing bat, Miniopterus schreibersii LR/cd
 Genus: Myotis Southern myotis, Myotis macropus LR/lc
 Genus: Nyctophilus Northern long-eared bat, Nyctophilus arnhemensis LR/lc
 Eastern long-eared bat, Nyctophilus bifax LR/lc
 Lesser long-eared bat, Nyctophilus geoffroyi LR/lc
 Gould's long-eared bat, Nyctophilus gouldi LR/lc
 Greater long-eared bat, Nyctophilus timoriensis DD
 Genus: Phoniscus Golden-tipped bat, Phoniscus papuensis LR/lc
 Genus: Scoteanax Rüppell's broad-nosed bat, Scoteanax rueppellii LR/lc
 Genus: Scotorepens Inland broad-nosed bat, Scotorepens balstoni LR/lc
 Little broad-nosed bat, Scotorepens greyii LR/lc
 Eastern broad-nosed bat, Scotorepens orion LR/lc
 Genus: Vespadelus Inland forest bat, Vespadelus baverstocki LR/lc
 Large forest bat, Vespadelus darlingtoni LR/lc
 Eastern forest bat, Vespadelus pumilus LR/lc
 Southern forest bat, Vespadelus regulus LR/lc
 Eastern cave bat, Vespadelus troughtoni LR/lc
 Little forest bat, Vespadelus vulturnus LR/lc
 Suborder: Yinpterochiroptera
 Family: Rhinolophidae
 Genus: Rhinolophus Smaller horseshoe bat, Rhinolophus megaphyllus LR/lc

 Order: Lagomorpha 
 Family: Leporidae
 Genus: Lepus European hare, Lepus europaeus LC introduced
 Genus: Oryctolagus European rabbit, Oryctolagus cuniculus EN introduced

 Order: Rodentia 
 Family: Muridae
 Genus: Hydromys Rakali, Hydromys chrysogaster LR/lc
 Genus: Leggadina Forrest's mouse, Leggadina forresti LR/lc
 Genus: Leporillus Lesser stick-nest rat, Leporillus apicalis CR
 Greater stick-nest rat, Leporillus conditor VU
 Genus: Mastacomys Broad-toothed mouse, Mastacomys fuscus LR/nt
 Genus: Melomys Grassland mosaic-tailed rat, Melomys burtoni LR/lc
 Fawn-footed mosaic-tailed rat, Melomys cervinipes LR/lc
 Genus: Mus House mouse, Mus musculus LR/lc introduced
 Genus: Notomys Fawn hopping mouse, Notomys cervinus VU
 Dusky hopping mouse, Notomys fuscus VU
 Mitchell's hopping mouse, Notomys mitchellii LR/lc
 Genus: Pseudomys Silky mouse, Pseudomys apodemoides LR/lc
 Plains rat, Pseudomys australis VU
 Bolam's mouse, Pseudomys bolami LR/lc
 Little native mouse, Pseudomys delicatulus LR/lc
 Desert mouse, Pseudomys desertor LR/nt
 Smoky mouse, Pseudomys fumeus EN
 Eastern chestnut mouse, Pseudomys gracilicaudatus LR/lc
 Sandy inland mouse, Pseudomys hermannsburgensis LR/lc
 New Holland mouse, Pseudomys novaehollandiae VU
 Hastings River mouse, Pseudomys oralis VU
 Pilliga mouse, Pseudomys pilligaensis VU
 Genus: Rattus Bush rat, Rattus fuscipes LR/lc
 Australian swamp rat, Rattus lutreolus LR/lc
 Brown rat, Rattus norvegicus LR/lc introduced
 Black rat, Rattus rattus LR/lc introduced
 Dusky field rat, Rattus sordidus LR/nt
 Pale field rat, Rattus tunneyi LR/nt
 Long-haired rat, Rattus villosissimus LR/lc

 Order: Sirenia 
 Family: Dugonginae
 Genus: Dugong Dugong, Dugong dugon'' VU

References

New South Wales